The Ysleta–Zaragoza International Bridge is an international crossing over the Rio Grande, connecting the United States-Mexico border cities of El Paso, Texas, and Ciudad Juárez, Chihuahua. The bridge is also known as "Zaragoza Bridge", "Puente Zaragoza" and "Puente Ysleta-Zaragoza".

Description
The Ysleta–Zaragoza International Bridge consists of two four-lane bridges. One is for commercial traffic only and the other, also bearing two pedestrian walkways, is for private vehicles. The bridge was built in 1938 and reconstructed in 1955. The present bridge was completed in 1990. The American side of the bridge is owned and operated by the City of El Paso.

Border crossing

The El Paso Ysleta Port of Entry was established in 1938 when the first bridge was built at this location.   The current border inspection station was constructed along with the 1990 bridge reconstruction.

References

International bridges in Texas
International bridges in Chihuahua (state)
Toll bridges in Texas
Bridges completed in 1998
Buildings and structures in El Paso, Texas
Transportation in El Paso, Texas
Road bridges in Texas
Toll bridges in Mexico
Transportation buildings and structures in El Paso County, Texas